WAKI (1230 AM) is a radio station licensed to McMinnville, Tennessee, United States.  The station is owned by Peg Broadcasting, LLC.

References

External links

AKI